Guilford is a large country farmhouse near Frederick, Maryland, built in 1809.  Formerly the center of a  farm, the brick house retains many of its outbuildings despite its location in the middle of a suburban shopping and office development.

Guilford was listed on the National Register of Historic Places in 1975.

Notes

External links
, including photo in 2003, at Maryland Historical Trust
Guilford, Journey Through Hallowed Ground

Houses on the National Register of Historic Places in Maryland
Victorian architecture in Maryland
Neoclassical architecture in Maryland
Houses completed in 1820
Houses in Frederick County, Maryland
National Register of Historic Places in Frederick County, Maryland